In printing, a key plate is the plate which prints the detail in an image.

When printing color images by combining multiple colors of inks, the colored inks usually do not contain much image detail. The key plate, which is usually impressed using black ink, provides the lines, contrast, or both, of the image. However, in two-color images where neither color was black, the key plate might have been printed in the darker of the two colors. Key plate is synonymous with keystone in the same context.

See also
CMYK color model
Key type stamp

References

Printing terminology